Vladislav Alekseyevich Ryzhkov (born 28 February 1990) is a Russian former footballer.

Club career
He made his debut for the FC Spartak Moscow first team on 31 August 2008 when he came on as a substitute with 2 minutes left to play in a game against FC Spartak Nalchik. He started the next game against FC Moscow on 13 September 2008 and scored a goal in that game.

International career
Ryzhkov was a part of the Russia U-21 side that was competing in the 2011 European Under-21 Championship qualification.

References

External links
  Player page on the official FC Spartak Moscow website
 
 
 

1990 births
Living people
Footballers from Voronezh
Russian footballers
Association football midfielders
Russia under-21 international footballers
Russian expatriate footballers
Expatriate footballers in Belarus
Russian Premier League players
FC Spartak Moscow players
FC Shinnik Yaroslavl players
FC Zhemchuzhina Sochi players
FC Kuban Krasnodar players
FC Volga Nizhny Novgorod players
FC Arsenal Tula players
FC Sibir Novosibirsk players
FC Vitebsk players
FC Tambov players
FC Urozhay Krasnodar players
Belarusian Premier League players